Ahmad Al Subaih (born 6 October 1980) pronounced as (AlSObeeeh) is a Kuwaiti footballer who is a defender for the Kuwaiti Premier League club Al Kuwait.

References

1980 births
Living people
Kuwaiti footballers
Sportspeople from Kuwait City
Association football defenders
Kuwait international footballers
Kuwait SC players
Kuwait Premier League players